The 1985 Skate Canada International was held in London, Ontario on October 24–26. Medals were awarded in the disciplines of men's singles, ladies' singles, pair skating, and ice dancing.

Results

Men

Ladies

Pairs

Reference:

Ice dancing

References

Skate Canada International, 1985
Skate Canada International
1985 in Canadian sports 
1985 in Ontario